Wang Lina (born February 28, 1983, in Benxi, Liaoning) is a Chinese long jumper.

Wang won the silver medal at the 2002 World Junior Championships, and competed at the 2004 Olympic Games without reaching the final.

In 2005, she tested positive for the banned substance norandrosterone. She was suspended from the sport between August 2005 and August 2007.

Her personal best jump is 6.72 metres, achieved in July 2004 in Beijing.

See also
List of sportspeople sanctioned for doping offences

References
sports-reference.com profile
Chinese delegation 2004

1983 births
Living people
Athletes (track and field) at the 2004 Summer Olympics
Chinese female long jumpers
Chinese sportspeople in doping cases
Doping cases in athletics
Olympic athletes of China
People from Benxi
Athletes from Liaoning
21st-century Chinese women